Grand Slam is a 1933 American pre-Code comedy film directed by William Dieterle and Alfred E. Green and starring Paul Lukas, Loretta Young and Frank McHugh. The film was released by Warner Bros. on March 18, 1933.

Plot
A waiter named Peter Stanislavsky learns the game of bridge as a favor to his new bride Marcia, whose entire family plays the game. When he luckily defeats bridge champion Cedric Van Dorn, Peter jokingly claims that he won because of the "Stanislavsky method", and soon becomes world-famous as a bridge expert.

Trouble ensues when Peter and Marcia form a team to play in bridge tournaments. Peter infuriates Marcia by questioning her play.

Cast
 Paul Lukas as Peter Stanislavsky  
 Loretta Young as Marcia Stanislavsky  
 Frank McHugh as Philip 'Speed' McCann  
 Glenda Farrell as Blondie  
 Helen Vinson as Lola Starr  
 Roscoe Karns as Contest Radio Announcer  
 Ferdinand Gottschalk as Cedric Van Dorn
 Reginald Barlow as Theodore
 Walter Byron as Barney Starr
 Esther Howard as Mary
 William H. Strauss as Waiter

References

Bibliography
 Bubbeo, Daniel. The Women of Warner Brothers: The Lives and Careers of 15 Leading Ladies, with Filmographies for Each. McFarland, 2001.

External links
 
 
 
 
 Poster and stills at themotionpictures.net

1933 films
1933 comedy films
American black-and-white films
American comedy films
Films directed by William Dieterle
Films directed by Alfred E. Green
First National Pictures films
Warner Bros. films
1930s English-language films
1930s American films
Films scored by Bernhard Kaun
Films about card games
English-language comedy films